Whatever Happened to Interracial Love? is a posthumous 2016 collection of short stories by author Kathleen Collins.  The title story was published by Granta in July 2016.

Critical reception
The New York Times wrote "The best of these stories are a revelation. Ms. Collins had a gift for illuminating what the critic Albert Murray called the 'black intramural class struggle,' and two or three of her stories are so sensitive and sharp and political and sexy I suspect they will be widely anthologized."

Claire Fallon of HuffPost praised the book saying "in poignant, searching scenes and contemplations, readers will be reintroduced to a great and under-appreciated creative talent in Kathleen Collins."

References

2016 short story collections
Books published posthumously
African-American short story collections
Ecco Press books